The Rognon is a 73 km long river in France, right tributary of the Marne. Its source is near the village Is-en-Bassigny. It flows generally northwest, through the department of Haute-Marne.
The Rognon flows into the Marne at Mussey-sur-Marne, south of Joinville. Its largest tributary is the Sueurre.

References

Rivers of France
Rivers of Grand Est
Rivers of Haute-Marne